Phenkanya Phaisankiattikun (born 7 September 2000) is a Thai taekwondo practitioner. She represented Thailand at the 2018 Asian Games and competed in both individual and women's team event. She clinched gold medal in the women's team poomsae event along with fellow taekwondo practitioners Kotchawan Chomchuen and Ornawee Srisahakit defeating favourites South Korea in the final.

In 2016, she jointly with Kotchawan Chomchuen and Ornawee Srisahakit claimed the Poomsae World Championship title in the women's team category for Thailand, which also historically became the first ever Poomsae World Championship title victory for Thailand.

References 
 
 
2000 births
Living people
Phenkanya Phaisankiattikun
Taekwondo practitioners at the 2018 Asian Games
Medalists at the 2018 Asian Games
Phenkanya Phaisankiattikun
Asian Games medalists in taekwondo
Phenkanya Phaisankiattikun
Phenkanya Phaisankiattikun
Competitors at the 2017 Southeast Asian Games
Phenkanya Phaisankiattikun